Marion Township is one of the fifteen townships of Marion County, Ohio, United States.  The 2010 census found 44,749 people in the township, 36,837 of whom lived in the city of Marion.

Geography
Located in the center of the county, it borders the following townships:
Grand Prairie Township - north
Scott Township - northeast corner
Claridon Township - east
Richland Township - southeast corner
Pleasant Township - south
Green Camp Township - southwest
Big Island Township - west
Salt Rock Township - northwest corner

Most of the city of Marion, the county seat of Marion County, is located in central Marion Township.

Name and history
It is one of twelve Marion Townships statewide.

Government
The township is governed by a three-member board of trustees, who are elected in November of odd-numbered years to a four-year term beginning on the following January 1. Two are elected in the year after the presidential election and one is elected in the year before it. There is also an elected township fiscal officer, who serves a four-year term beginning on April 1 of the year after the election, which is held in November of the year before the presidential election. Vacancies in the fiscal officership or on the board of trustees are filled by the remaining trustees.

References

External links
County website

Townships in Marion County, Ohio
Townships in Ohio